During the Second Sino-Japanese war, the invading Japanese established a variety of puppet governments such as the Provisional Government of China and the Reformed Government of China which used the flag of Five Races Under One Union even though the legitimate Chinese Government had switched to the current day modern flag of the Republic of China.

When the Wang Jingwei regime was established on 30 March 1940 in Nanjing, Wang Jingwei was slated to take over the previous Japanese-installed governments and centralize the Chinese nationalists under what they claimed to be the legitimate successor to the Republic of China he demanded to use the modern flag as a means to challenge the authority of the Chongqing government under Chiang Kai-shek and position himself as the rightful successor to Sun Yat-sen.

However, the Japanese preferred the five-colored Five Races Under One Union flag. As a compromise, the Japanese suggested adding a triangular yellow pennant on top with the slogan "Peace, Anti-Communism, National Construction" (和平反共建國, Hépíng fǎn'gòng jiàn guó) in black, but this was rejected by Wang. In the end, Wang and the Japanese agreed that the yellow banner was to be used outdoors only, until 1943 when the banner was abandoned, leaving two rival governments with the same flag, each claiming to be the legitimate government of China.

Variants of the state flag 

There were multiple variants of the pendent used by the Wang Jingwei Government, these variants were based on regional choice.

Naval jack and naval ensign 

The war ensign was adopted in commemoration of the second anniversary that the capital was relocated on the 1 May 1942.

See also 

 Five Races Under One Union
 Blue Sky with a White Sun
 Flag of the Republic of China
 Flag of the People's Republic of China
 Flag of Mengjiang
 Collaborationist Chinese Army
 Flag of Manchukuo
 List of Chinese flags

References 

C
C

nl:Vlag van China#Chinese vlaggen tijdens de Tweede Wereldoorlog